Mustaqeem Ahmed (born 24 December 1978) is a Pakistani former cricketer. He played eight first-class and four List A matches for several domestic teams in Pakistan between 1993 and 2003.

See also
 List of Pakistan Automobiles Corporation cricketers

References

External links
 

1978 births
Living people
Pakistani cricketers
Lahore Blues cricketers
Lahore Whites cricketers
Pakistan Automobiles Corporation cricketers
Cricketers from Lahore